The Alysheba Stakes is a Grade II American Thoroughbred horse race for horses aged three and older  over a distance of  miles on the dirt held annually in early May on the Kentucky Oaks day meeting at Churchill Downs in Louisville, Kentucky  during the spring meeting.

History

The Alysheba became the most recent addition to the Derby Week stakes with the inaugural running on 30 April 2004 as the sixth race on the undercard of the Kentucky Oaks day meeting. It was the first stakes to join the Derby Week lineup since 1997.

The event is named for the talented 1987 Kentucky Derby winner and United States Racing Hall of Fame inductee,  Alysheba, who returned to the Downs in 1988 to win the Breeders' Cup Classic. His victory marked the first time a Derby winner had returned to Churchill to win a stakes since Whirlaway took the 1942 Clark Handicap.

The event received graded status in 2007 and was upgrade to Grade II in 2012.

The 2012 winner Successful Dan broke the track record for the distance which to date still holds.

Records

Speed record
  miles:  1:41.04 -  Successful Dan   (2012)

 Margins
 6 lengths - Take Charge Indy (2013)

Most wins by a jockey
 3 - John Velazquez    (2004, 2005, 2015)

Most wins by a trainer
 2 - Todd Pletcher (2005, 2015)
 2 - Bob Baffert (2011, 2019)

Winners

See also
 List of American and Canadian Graded races

References

Graded stakes races in the United States
Grade 2 stakes races in the United States
Open mile category horse races
Churchill Downs horse races
Recurring sporting events established in 2004
2004 establishments in Kentucky